Lambert Josef Alois Frenken (27 September 1854 – 10 September 1943) was a German jurist and politician (Centre Party). During the Weimar Republic era, he briefly served as Minister of Justice in the first cabinet of Hans Luther (from January to November 1925).

Life and career

Frenken was born on 27 September 1854 at  near Heinsberg. He joined the Prussian civil service and was awarded a "Dr. jur." before becoming a public prosecutor at Cologne. From 1899 he worked in the Prussian Ministry of Justice and in 1913 became Ministerialdirektor in the department for criminal cases and prison administration.

From 1914 to 1916, Frenken served as Unterstaatssekretär (under secretary) at the German Ministry for Alsace-Lorraine. In 1916 he became president of the Higher Regional Court of Cologne. He retired as a judge in 1922, but in January 1925 became Reichsjustizminister (Minister of Justice) in the first cabinet of Hans Luther as he was close to (or actually a member of) the Catholic Centre Party. While in office, he was also in charge of the Ministry for the Occupied Territories. Frenken resigned on 21 November 1925, protesting the Locarno Treaties, which he had strictly opposed.

Frenken died on 10 September 1943 at Cologne.

References

1854 births
1943 deaths
Jurists from North Rhine-Westphalia
University of Marburg alumni
University of Göttingen alumni
University of Bonn alumni
Government ministers of Germany
German prosecutors